The Central District of Savadkuh County is a district (bakhsh) in Savadkuh County, Mazandaran Province, Iran. At the 2006 census, its population was 42,679, in 11,396 families.  The District has three cities: Pol Sefid, Zirab, and Alasht. The District has four rural districts (dehestan): Kaseliyan Rural District, Rastupey Rural District, Sorkhkola Rural District, and Valupey Rural District.

References 

Savadkuh County
Districts of Mazandaran Province